The Role of Her Life is a 2004 French drama film directed by François Favrat. Karin Viard was nominated for the Best Actress award in the César Awards 2005.

Plot
The film tells the story of a freelance fashion magazine writer named Claire Rocher who meets Elisabeth Becker, an actress. Claire's life soon turns upside down after the actress decides to hire her as personal assistant.

Cast
Agnès Jaoui – Elisabeth Becker
Karin Viard – Claire Rocher
Jonathan Zaccaï – Mathias Curval
Marcial Di Fonzo Bo – Luis
Claude Crétient – Laurent Bompard
Laurent Lafitte – Arnaud
Denis Sebbah – Franck
Anna Mouglalis – Herself
Valérie Benguigui – Viviane

Awards and nominations
César Awards (France)
Nominated: Best Actress – Leading Role (Karin Viard)
Montréal Film Festival (Canada)
Won: Best Actress – Leading Role (Karin Viard)
Won: Best Screenplay (Jérôme Beaujour, Roger Bohbot, François Favrat and Julie Lopes-Curval)
Nominated: Grand Prix des Amériques (François Favrat)

References

External links

2004 drama films
2004 films
Films directed by François Favrat
French drama films
2000s French films